Stephen Andrew Butterfill is a British philosopher and Professor of Philosophy at the University of Warwick. He is known for his research on philosophical issues in cognitive and developmental psychology.

Personal life
He lives in Southampton, UK with his wife Elisabeth Schroeder-Butterfill (Lecturer in Gerontology at the University of Southampton) and four children.

Books
 The Developing Mind: A Philosophical Introduction, Routledge, 2010, 
 Tool Use and Causal Cognition, edited with Teresa McCormack and Christoph Hoerl, Oxford University Press, 2012,

References

External links
Stephen Butterfill at the University of Warwick
Personal Website

Philosophy academics
Living people
Academics of the University of Warwick
Alumni of the University of Oxford
Philosophers of psychology
21st-century British philosophers
Year of birth missing (living people)